A constitutional referendum was held in Brazil on 21 April 1993 to determine the form of government of the country. After the re-democratization of Brazil, an article in the new Constitution determined the holding of a referendum for voters to decide if the country should remain a republic or become a monarchy again, and if the system of government should be presidential or parliamentary. Voting for "monarchy" and "presidentialism" in tandem would annul one's vote.

At the time, the country had been a republic for 104 years since the coup d'état that overthrew the monarchy on 15 November 1889 and, apart from a brief parliamentarian experience between 1961 and 1963 (also defeated in a referendum), the system had been presidential. Since the republic was originally a provisional government resulting from a military coup, a decree under the first republican Constitution predicted another referendum to popularly legitimate or change the current form of government.

As to the 1993 referendum, the Constitution specified that Congress, sitting in joint session, would be empowered to effect a revision of the Constitution in 1994 by an absolute majority instead of the qualified majority procedure with separate votes in both houses of Congress that is usually required for constitutional amendments; any change of regime decided during the referendum would be adopted during the said constitutional revision.

Federal Law n° 8.624, signed into law by President Itamar Franco on 4 February 1993, regulated the holding of the referendum.

An overwhelming majority of voters favoured the republican regime and the presidential system. In spite of heavy campaigning on TV and radio, turnout was relatively low (73%), considering that voting is compulsory in the country.

Origin
The attempted resurrection of the imperial regime came from federal deputy Antônio Henrique Bittencourt da Cunha Bueno (from São Paulo's Social Democratic Party), a member of the Constituent Assembly which approved the Constitution which put an end to the military regime. A monarchist since a child, and son of Antônio Sílvio Cunha Bueno, one of SDP's founders in São Paulo, he decided to propose to his fellow deputies the hold of a referendum to give the people the possibility to choose the form of government they preferred. His main argument was that during the reign of Pedro II, Brazil had experienced a period of great stability. Surprisingly, his proposal was included in the new Constitution. Bueno managed to convince the Constituent Assembly that, since the Republic had been proclaimed in Brazil by means of a military coup d'état in 1889, without any say of the people, the Brazilian Nation should be given the chance of deciding the form of Government of their choice. Given that, when the Constitution was approved in 1988, the country was in a process of returning to democracy after a long military regime, the idea of giving the people the opportunity to decide their form of Government (either choosing the restoration of the Monarchy or opting for the Republic, an option that would give popular legitimacy to a form of Government that had been first imposed in a military coup) gained wide support in the Constituent Assembly. Also, several members of the Assembly were in favour of a parliamentary republic (the original drafts of the Constitution provided for a parliamentary system of government within a republic, but a vote by the Assembly altered the draft so as to preserve the presidential Executive); those members of the Assembly who favored a parliamentary model and who had been defeated in the system of government vote then supported the proposal that led to the inclusion in the Constitution of the provision summoning the referendum. The supporters of a parliamentary republic, who desired only a referendum on the system of government (parliamentary or presidential) voted in favour of Bueno's proposal for a question also dealing with the form of Government (monarchy or republic), because they reckoned that all monarchists would also vote for a parliamentary model in the system of government question.

In May 1992, Bueno launched the Parliamentary Monarchist Movement alongside Pedro Gastão of Orléans-Braganza, then head of the Petrópolis branch of the Brazilian Imperial Family and one of the two claimants to the defunct Brazilian throne. According to him, only petistas were able to rival the monarchist militancy. On 4 February 1993, President Itamar Franco signed into law the bill N° 8.624, which regulated the holding of the referendum.

Campaign

According to some polling institutes, the monarchist campaign was able to obtain the support of 22% of the voters in 1992. Concerned about this, the main political parties at that time, such as PT, PFL, PMDB and PTB formed the so-called Presidential Front on one side and the Parliamentary Front (PSDB) at the other side in order to oppose the ambitions of royalist groups. In spite of the defeat obtained by the monarchist movement, their slogan Vote for the king became one of the most well known in the history of Brazilian electoral campaigns, and 13.4% of the voters supported a monarchical regime.

Results

State results

See also
Monarchism in Brazil

References

Referendums in Brazil
1993 in Brazil
Brazil
1993 elections in Brazil
Constitutional referendums
Monarchy referendums
April 1993 events in South America